The West Godavari district is a coastal district in the Indian state of Andhra Pradesh with an administrative headquarters in Bhimavaram. It is bounded by the Krishna district and Bay of Bengal to the south, East Godavari district to the east, and Eluru district, Kolleru Lake and Upputeru Drain to the northwest.

History 
The Eastern Chalukyas ruled coastal Andhra Pradesh from 700 to 1200 CE, with their capital in Vengi. Historical evidence of their rule has been found in the nearby villages of Pedavegi and Guntupalli (Jilakarragudem). Eluru then became a part of the Kalinga Empire until 1471 CE before conquest by the Gajapati Empire. In 1515 CE, Sri Krishna Deva Raya captured it. After the fall of the Vijayanagara Kingdom, it was ruled by the Qutb Shahi Dynasty's Sultans of Golkonda. On 15 April 1925, the West Godavari District was formed with Bhimavaram as its headquarters, and all of the district offices and regional offices were centralized in Eluru.

During the Madras Presidency in 1823, the District of Rajahmundry was created. It was reorganized in 1859 and bifurcated into the Godavari and Krishna districts. During British rule, Rajahmundry was the headquarters of Godavari district, which was further bifurcated into the East Godavari and West Godavari districts in 1925. When the Godavari district was divided, Kakinada became the headquarters of East Godavari and Eluru became the headquarters of West Godavari. After the 4 April 2022 bifurcation for a separate Eluru district, Bhimavaram became the new headquarters of the West Godavari district.

Geography 
The district is bounded by the East Godavari district on the North, Eluru district on the Northwest, Kakinada district on the Southeast, Krishna district on the Southwest. and Bay of Bengal on the south. The Godavari River flows on the east, while the Tammileru River and Kolleru Lake separate it from the Krishna district on the west.

Rivers and topography 
West Godavari is a flat region with a slightly slope along the rivers flowing eastward. The three rivers cutting through the district are the Godavari (after which the district is named), the Yerrakaluva, and the Tammileru. Sir Arthur Cotton Barrage, Eluru Canal, Vijayarai Anicut, Tammileru, Jalleru, and the Yerrakaluva reservoirs are the major sources of irrigation.

Climate 
The region has a tropical climate similar to the rest of the Coastal Andhra region. The summers (March–June) are very hot and dry, while the winters are much cooler. The temperatures in the summers often rise over 50 °C during the day. The rainy season (July–December) is considered the best time for tourist visits, as the fields are bright green with paddy crops, rivers are flowing with monsoon water, and climate is relatively cool. There are several large mensions scattered around the Godavari area that once belonged to zamindars.

Demographics 
As of the 2011 Census of India, the West Godavari district has a population of 3,936,966 with 1,091,525 households, which is the 11th most populous district in the state. The district's population is approximately equal to the population of Croatia and the American state of Oklahoma.
Its population growth rate between 2001–2011 was 3.45%. West Godavari has a sex ratio of 1004 females for every 1000 males and stands at the eighth position. It has the highest literacy rate among all Andhra Pradesh districts with 26,52,389 (74.63%) literate residents. 20.6% of the district's population lives in urban areas.

After bifurcation, the district had a population of 1,779,935, with a sex ratio of 1002 females to 1000 males. 468,924 (26.35%) of the population lives in urban areas. Scheduled Castes and Scheduled Tribes made up 289,195 (16.25%) and 15,670 (0.88%) of the population respectively. Telugu was the predominant language, spoken by 98.67% of the population.

Economy 

Paddy, banana, sugarcane, and coconut are the main agricultural products cultivated in the district. The agriculture sector contributes , industries contribute , and services contribute  to the gross district domestic product. The major products contributing to the gross value added of the district from agriculture and allied services are the previously listed agricultural products, as well as milk, meat, and fisheries. The gross value added to the industrial and service sector is contributed from construction, electricity, manufacturing, unorganized trade, and transport.

Cashew nut, mango and tobacco are other important produce from the district. Shrimp production is also a main activity along with fish farming. The woolen pile carpet industry in Eluru produces eco-friendly carpets from exported wool.

Culture 
Telugu is the most widely spoken language. The Vedas, which have oral heritage recognition by UNESCO, are taught at the Sri Venkateswara Veda Patasala of the district's Bhimavaram village. The district is well known for its wool-pile carpets and hand woven products.

Tourism and landmarks 
Eluru is the largest city of the district with many destinations having Buddhists and archeological importance, such as the Guntupalli Caves, one of the top 30 Indian heritage sites, near the city. Eluru hosts a 74-foot high Buddha statue in the heart of the city.

Some of the religious destinations include Dwaraka Tirumala, known by the name of Chinna Tirumala, Veerabhadra Temple, Pattiseema, and Pancharama Kshetras of Palakollu and Bhimavaram. Other tourist destinations of importance are Perupalem Beach at Narasapuram, the Kolleru Lake (the largest fresh water lake in the country and a bird sanctuary), Sir Arthur Cotton Barrage, and Havelock Bridge. The Government of Andhra Pradesh is keen on developing Rajahmundry Airport as an international airport to boost tourism, including helicopter tours over the Godavari districts. The Polavaram Project irrigation system is expected to become another tourist attraction for the district.

Administrative divisions 

The new West Godavari district has three revenue divisions in Bhimavaram, Tadepalligudem and Narasapuram. These revenue divisions divide the district into 20 mandals. These 20 mandals consists of 296 Revenue villages, 0 municipal corporations, and 6 municipalities (Narasapuram, Palakollu, Tadepalligudem, Tanuku, and Bhimavaram, Akiveedu.

Parliament Segment
Narasapuram (Lok Sabha constituency)

Assembly Segments
Narasapuram Lok Sabha constituency presently comprises the following Legislative Assembly segments:

Erstwhile Talukas 
Before the formation of mandals, the district was administered through a system of talukas. In 1978, the number of talukas in the West Godavari district increased from 8 to 19. In 1985, the 19 talukas were divided into 46 mandals.

The Andhra Pradesh Reorganisation Act of 2014, merged two mandals from Telangana into the West Godavari District for unified governance over the Polavaram Project, increasing the total mandals to 48.

Cities and towns

Constituencies 
There is one parliamentary and seven assembly constituencies in the district. The parliamentary constituency is Narsapuram (Lok Sabha constituency)

The Assembly constituencies are:

Transport

Roadways 

The district relies mostly on public transport, such as buses of the Andhra Pradesh State Road Transport Corporation. Most of the major national highways, like NH216 and NH165, pass through towns in the district.

Railways 
The South Central Railway division of Indian Railways operates many passenger routes and freight transport through the district. The Howrah-Chennai main line, Vijayawada–Nidadavolu loop line, and Bhimavaram–Narasapuram branch lines are the major lines and sections that provide rail connectivity in the district. The Kovvur-Bhadrachalam Railway line and Kotipalli-Narsapur Railway line are the major railway projects in the district.

Airways 
Since the district's Tadepalligudem Airport is not operational, the adjacent Rajahmundry Airport is utilized instead.

Waterways 
National Waterway 4 passes through the district and connects Puducherry with Kakinada and Rajahmundry via Tadepalligudem, Eluru. It has access to the Bay of Bengal at Narsapuram. The Andhra Pradesh state government began construction of a fishing harbor in Narsapuram in September 2021.

Education 
The primary and secondary schools are maintained by the government under the state's School Education Department of the state, supplemented by private institutions. According to the school information report for the 2015–16 academic year, there are a total of 4,408 schools. They include 19 government, 2,664 mandal and zilla parishads, 1 residential schools, 1,344 private schools, 3 Kasturba Gandhi Balika Vidyalaya (KGBV), 208 municipal schools, and 169 other types of schools. The total number of students enrolled in primary, upper primary, and high schools within the district was 522,793 during the 2015-16 school year.

Universities
 National Institute of Technology, Tadepalligudem (NIT, Tadepalligudem)
 Dr. Y.S.R. Horticultural University, Venkataramannagudem, Tadepalligudem

Notable people 

 Chiranjeevi, film actor, Central Minister
 Prabhas, actor
 Alluri Sitarama Raju, freedom fighter
 Krishnam Raju, film actor, Central Minister
 Ramalinga Raju, founder of Satyam Computer Services 
 Trivikram Srinivas, film director
 Sunil (actor), actor
 Arvind Krishna, IBM CEO
 Krishna Vamsi, film director
 Brahmaji, film actor

See also 
 List of villages in West Godavari district

References

External links

 West Godavari district official website
 Official website

 
Districts of Andhra Pradesh
1925 establishments in India